Vladimir Vasilyevich Yermoshin (tr. Uladzimir Vasilevich Yarmoshyn; ; born 26 October 1942) is a politician from Belarus.

Prime Minister

He served as was Prime Minister of Belarus from 18 February 2000 to 1 October 2001.  Yermoshin exercised his Prime Ministerial office under the Presidency of Alexander Lukashenko.

Mayor of Minsk

Yermoshin previously served as Mayor of Minsk, capital of Belarus, from 1995 to 2000.

See also

 Politics of Belarus

References

1942 births
Living people
People from Pronsky District
Prime Ministers of Belarus